The Linnaean Garden or Linnaeus Garden is the oldest of the botanical gardens belonging to Uppsala University, Sweden, and nowadays one of two satellite gardens of the larger University of Uppsala Botanic Garden, the other being the Linnaeus family's former summer home Linnaeus's Hammarby. The garden has been restored and is kept as an 18th-century botanical garden, according to the specifications of Carl Linnaeus, who started studying at Uppsala University in 1730 where he later became professor of botany and principal and is known for formalising the modern system of naming organisms, creating the modern binomial nomenclature, and who owned the garden from 1741 and had it rearranged according to his own ideas, documented in his work Hortus Upsaliensis (1748).

The garden was originally planned and planted by Olaus Rudbeck, professor of medicine, in 1655, and had about 1,800 different species in late 17th century, but was damaged in the 1702 Uppsala city fire. In 1693, Rudbeck also built the house adjacent to the garden, nowadays known as the Linnaeus Museum (Linnémuséet), which was residence of Linnaeus from 1743, and from his death in 1778 to 1934 residence of employees at Uppsala University, the last of whom was musician Hugo Alfvén. Since 1937, the house has been a museum of Linnaeus personal and professional life, with furniture, household items and textiles belonging to the Linnaeus family exhibited together with Linnaeus personal medicinal cabinet, insect cabinet and herbarium.

After the gardens of Uppsala Castle had been donated to the university by King Gustav III to serve as a new botanical garden, the old one was left to decay. It was bought by the Swedish Linnaean Society in 1917 and restored according to the detailed description in the Hortus Upsaliensis. The garden was later taken over by the university, while the Linnaeus Museum is still run by the Society.

References

Gallery
Photos of the Linnean Museum

External links

Botanical gardens of Uppsala University
Museums in Uppsala
Biographical museums in Sweden
Science museums in Sweden
Commemoration of Carl Linnaeus